The following ships of the Indian Navy have been named INS Magar:

  was an amphibious warfare ship acquired in 1949 from the Royal Navy, where it served in World War II as 
  is the lead vessel of her class of amphibious warfare vessels, currently in active service with the Indian Navy

Indian Navy ship names